Marcello Polisi (born January 24, 1997) is a Canadian soccer player who currently plays for Canadian Premier League side Valour FC.

Early life
Born in Burnaby, British Columbia, Polisi grew up in nearby Coquitlam. He began playing soccer at age four with Coquitlam Metro-Ford SC, from 2001 to 2011. In 2008 and 2009, he had training stints with the youth teams of Belgian club Standard Liège. In 2011, he joined the Vancouver Whitecaps Academy, after having previously been part of the Whitecaps Prospects program, which he captained the U11 and U12 levels and appeared with the U11 squad in Europe against European club academy teams. He also played on the British Columbia provincial team, serving as U13 captain and as a member of their U14 team and also trained in the Canadian Soccer Association’s National Training Centre program at U13 level. While with the Whitecaps Academy, he often served as captain at the various age levels. In 2015, he helped his high school win the AAA provincial championship.

University career
In August 2016, he committed to attend Simon Fraser University, where he would play for the men's soccer team. In his second game of his first season, he suffered an ankle injury against Seattle Pacific Falcons, which ended his season. He scored his first goal on August 31, 2017, against the University of Mary Marauders. In 2017, he was named Great Northwest Athletic Conference Player of the Year and a GNAC First-Team All-Star. He was also named an NCAA D2 All-American in 2017. In 2019, he was named to a GNAC First Team All-Star for the third consecutive year and was named to the All-West Region Second Team. His 2020 season was cancelled due to the COVID-19 pandemic. Over his time with Simon Fraser, he scored six goals and added seven assists in 51 appearances. He declared for the 2021 MLS SuperDraft, but was ultimately not selected.

Club career
In 2017, Polisi joined USL PDL club TSS FC Rovers, and played for the club through the 2019 season. In 2017, he made 5 appearances, followed by 14 appearances in 2018, and 3 appearances in 2019.

In June 2021, Polisi turned professional, joining Canadian Premier League side HFX Wanderers on a one year contract, with an option for a further year. He made his debut for the Wanderers on July 3 against Cavalry FC. In January 2022, the Wanderers announced they had exercised Polisi's contract option for the 2022 season. After the conclusion of the 2022 season, HFX announced Polisi would be departing the club.

In January 2023, Polisi signed with Valour FC.

International career
In June 2009, Polisi was captain and Most Valuable Player with the Western Canada team at the Danone Nations Cup. He was then selected to represent Canada at the 2010 Danone Nations Cup.

Polisi was called up to the Canadian National U-15 Team for the Copa Mexico de Naciones Sub-15, a boys' U-15 tournament in Ciudad de Mexico from June 16 to 25.

Personal life
He is the older brother of Matteo Polisi, who is also a professional soccer player.

References

External links

Living people
1997 births
Canadian soccer players
Canada men's youth international soccer players
Association football midfielders
TSS FC Rovers players
HFX Wanderers FC players
Canadian Premier League players
Soccer people from British Columbia
People from Coquitlam
Valour FC players